Malcolm Cuthbert Nokes MC MA BSc (20 May 1897 – 22 November 1986) was a British schoolteacher, soldier, research scientist and Olympic athlete, who competed in the hammer throw and discus throw.

Biography
He won the bronze medal in the hammer throw at the 1924 Summer Olympics. Four years later he finished eleventh in the 1928 Olympic hammer throw competition. In 1923 he beat the British hammer throw record, but did so in a demonstration rather than a competition, so his throw did not count for record purposes. 
 
He won the gold medal for England in the 1930 British Empire Games in the hammer throw contest and finished fifth in the discus throw event. At the 1934 British Empire Games he won again the gold medal in the hammer throw competition.

Nokes was the Amateur Athletic Association (AAA) Champion from 1923 to 1926 and placed second in 1921–22 and 1927–28. He was chairman of the AAA's Coaching Committee, and also a member of the Achilles Club.

He was a graduate of Magdalen College, Oxford, where he studied chemistry and wrote a thesis on metaphenetidine. Nokes served in the Great War in the Royal Artillery in the trenches and then as an observer in the Royal Flying Corps. He was awarded a Military Cross for his service, becoming MC Nokes MC. In the Second World War he served as an officer in the Royal Air Force Volunteer Reserve (Training Branch) while a schoolmaster.

He taught chemistry at Malvern College and later at Harrow School, where he was appointed Head of Science; he had come to the attention of Harrow when two schools colocated during the Second World War, although they did not merge. His practical demonstrations of the reaction of sodium with water were popular and famous among his pupils. These often entailed an explosion as MC Nokes put more than the recommended quantity of sodium into the water, and as the smoke cleared and noise subsided, MC Nokes would say "Note the small report." He was a member of the Science Masters' Association. Later he worked at Harwell and then was Head of Laboratories at CENTO Institute of Nuclear & Applied Science in Tehran. In retirement he lived in Honiton, Devon, and then in Alton, Hampshire. His nicknames included "Nokey", "Glaxo" and "Stally."

The chronology of his career was:
 1909—16 schoolboy at Bishop's Stortford College (School House A)
 1916—18 Royal Garrison Artillery (RGA) & Royal Flying Corps (RFC), served on the Western Front. (August 1917 awarded MC)
 1918—19 Royal Air Force, served on the Western Front
 1921 Completed the shortened course in Chemistry at Oxford University, Magdalen College, with a distinction
 1923 Awarded BSc. Chemistry, Oxford University, Magdalen College
 1922—46 Malvern College, science teacher & head of department. (Housemaster 1932–40)
 1946—57 Harrow School
 1957—59 Atomic Energy Research Establishment, Harwell (Isotope Division)
 1959—66 CENTO Institute of Nuclear Science, Tehran, with status of Third Secretary in the British Embassy, Tehran
 1966—69 Tehran University Institute of Nuclear Science 

During his time at Harrow, he served as a councillor in what is now Harrow London Borough Council, being elected as a Conservative for the ward of Harrow-on-the-Hill & Greenhill. During his service as a borough councillor, he proposed and was instrumental in bringing into service one of the first electric dust carts to be used in England, as part of the modernization of public health services in Harrow.

MC Nokes was one of eight children of Walter Nokes. His brothers included Gerald Dacre Nokes, a barrister and Indian judge, and George Augustus Nokes.

Publications
 Modern Glass-working and laboratory techniques'.' London, 1937: William Heinemann.
 Simple Experiments in the theory of flight. London, 1941: William Heinemann.
 "Aircraft instruments" in Air training manual; a practical guide to aero-engines, aircraft construction, wireless and electricity, and air navigation for members of the A. T. C. and all interested in modern aeronautics. London, 1943: Odhams Press.
 Science in education. London, 1949: Macdonald.
 Demonstrations in modern physics. London, 1952: William Heinemann.
 "Throwing the Hammer" (with Lt. Col. C. J. Reidy) in  Athletics, by Members of the Achilles Club.  (Ed.: Meyer, HM). London, 1955: JM Dent & Sons.
 Radioactivity measuring instruments: a guide to their construction and use. Melbourne, 1958: William Heinemann.

References

External links
 
Malcolm Nokes, Track Stats, May 2009

1897 births
1986 deaths
Athletes from London
People from Edmonton, London
People from Alton, Hampshire
People from Honiton
British male hammer throwers
British male discus throwers
English male hammer throwers
English male discus throwers
Olympic athletes of Great Britain
Olympic bronze medallists for Great Britain
Athletes (track and field) at the 1924 Summer Olympics
Athletes (track and field) at the 1928 Summer Olympics
Commonwealth Games gold medallists for England
Commonwealth Games medallists in athletics
Athletes (track and field) at the 1930 British Empire Games
Athletes (track and field) at the 1934 British Empire Games
Teachers at Harrow School
Royal Garrison Artillery officers
Royal Flying Corps officers
Officers
Royal Air Force personnel of World War I
Royal Air Force Volunteer Reserve personnel of World War II
Recipients of the Military Cross
Alumni of Magdalen College, Oxford
Academic staff of the University of Tehran
Science teachers
British Army personnel of World War I
20th-century chemists
Nuclear chemists
English chemists
Scientists from London
British nuclear physicists
Medalists at the 1924 Summer Olympics
Olympic bronze medalists in athletics (track and field)
Schoolteachers from Worcestershire
Medallists at the 1930 British Empire Games
Medallists at the 1934 British Empire Games